= Henriqueta Galeno =

Brazilian lawyer (b. 1887, d. 1964)

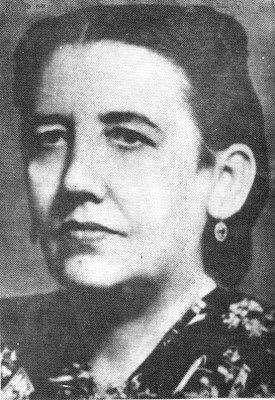
Henriqueta Galeno

Henriqueta Galeno (Fortaleza, February 23, 1887 - Fortaleza, September 10, 1964), was a Brazilian lawyer, writer and teacher.

== Early life ==
She studied at the College of the Immaculate Conception and in the Liceu do Ceará, graduating in law. In 1919, she founded and directed the Salon Juvenal Galeno, which was Ceará's main cultural development center. She created and installed the Center of Studies of Juvenal Galeno, the Feminine Wing and the publishing house Henriqueta Galeno. She was an active voice in the struggle for Brazilian women to have the right to vote.
